Thomas Grenville (1755–1846) was a British politician and bibliophile.

Thomas Grenville may also refer to:

Thomas Grenville (Royal Navy officer) (1719–1747), British politician and naval officer
Sir Thomas Grenville (died 1513), Sheriff of Cornwall

See also
Grenville (disambiguation)